Bonsor may refer to:

Alexander Bonsor (1851–1907), English footballer
Brian Bonsor (1926–2011), Scottish musician, composer and teacher
Sir Cosmo Bonsor (1848–1929), English brewer, businessman and politician
Fred Bonsor (1862–1932), English rugby union player
Sir Nicholas Bonsor (born 1942), English politician

See also
Bonsor baronets
Bonser

English-language surnames
Surnames of British Isles origin